Habenaria harroldii, commonly known as the southern rein orchid, is a species of orchid that is endemic to the Fraser Coast region of Queensland. It has up to five leaves at its base and up to twenty five white flowers with reduced side lobes on the labellum.

Description 
Flowering occurs from January to March.

Taxonomy and naming
Habenaria harroldii was first formally described in 1998 by David Jones from a specimen collected  near Tewantin and the description was published in The Orchadian. The specific epithet (harroldii) honours Arthur George Harrold who collected the type specimen.

Distribution and habitat
The southern rein grows with low shrubs and grasses in woodland between Tewantin and Maaroom.

References

Orchids of Queensland
Endemic orchids of Australia
Plants described in 1998
harroldii